"I Take It Back" is a song written by Buddy Buie and J. R. Cobb and performed by Sandy Posey.  It reached #12 on the U.S. pop chart in 1967.  It was featured on her 1967 album Sandy Posey Featuring "I Take It Back".

The song was arranged by Bill McElhiney and produced by Chips Moman.

The song ranked #88 on Billboard magazine's Top 100 singles of 1967.

Other versions
Patti Page released a version of the song on her 1967 album Today My Way.
Jeannie C. Riley released a version of the song as the B-side to her 1973 single "When Love Has Gone Away".

References

1967 songs
1967 singles
Songs written by Buddy Buie
Songs written by J. R. Cobb
Sandy Posey songs
Patti Page songs
Jeannie C. Riley songs
Song recordings produced by Chips Moman
MGM Records singles